Emergency Ward is a 1952 Argentine film directed by Tulio Demicheli. It was entered into the 1953 Cannes Film Festival.

Cast
 Aída Alberti
 Tito Alonso
 Arturo Arcari
 Margarita Corona
 Renée Dumas
 Roberto Escalada
 Mario Fortuna
 Analía Gadé
 Elisa Galvé (as Elisa Christian Galvé)
 Santiago Gómez Cou
 Diana Ingro
 Diana Maggi
 Lalo Malcolm
 Juan José Miguez
 Nelly Panizza
 Nathán Pinzón
 Perla Santalla
 Carlos Thompson

References

External links

1952 films
Argentine black-and-white films
1950s Spanish-language films
Films directed by Tulio Demicheli
Argentine drama films
1952 drama films
1950s Argentine films